David Wexler is an American film director, screenwriter, and film producer. Wexler is a New York City native and a graduate of the University of Wisconsin-Madison, where he majored in communication arts.

Prior to his feature films (Evil Weed, The Stand Up, Anchors, Turtle Island, Last Supper, and Vigilante), Wexler created and produced the reality show College Life for MTV.

Wexler has written and directed many commercials and corporate videos. He worked with Curtis Sliwa and the Guardian Angels to create a comic book and a handbook, as well as a clothing line available at Barking Irons.

Wexler founded the production company Cinema 59 Productions in 2006. Cinema 59 often works with Creative Diversions, a toy and game company to create 360 degree entertainment.

Wexler's film, Motorcycle Drive By, about Third Eye Blind, was an official selection of the 2020 Tribeca Film Festival. In 2021 his game Fish Club was nominated for the Toy Of The Year Award. Most recently, his film Disintegration Loops was an official selection of the 2021 SXSW Film Festival.

Filmography (as writer, director)
 American Gothic (2007)
 My First Kiss (2008)
 Evil Weed (2009)
 The Stand Up (2010)
 Anchors (2012)
 Turtle Island (2012)
 Last Supper (2018)
 Vigilante: The Incredible True Story of Curtis Sliwa and the Guardian Angels (2018)
 Motorcycle Drive By (2020)
 Disintegration Loops (2021)

Filmography (as actor)
 Turtle Island (2012)
 I'm Not Here (2017)

Television (as Creator/Producer)
 College Life (2009)

Web Series (as Creator/Producer)
 Movie Life (2009)

References

External links
 

Living people
1983 births
American film directors